Hugh Crawford may refer to:

 Hugh Crawford (politician) (born 1941), Michigan politician
 Hugh Crawford (sheriff) (1195–1265), Sheriff of Ayrshire, Chief of Clan Crawford and Lord of Loudon Castle
 Hugh Adam Crawford (1898–1982), Scottish painter
 Hugh Alexander Crawford (1873–1951), Michigan politician
 Hugh Archibald Crawford (c. 1824–1881), South Australian businessman
 Hugh Ralston Crawford (1876–1954), engineer and architect in Australia and the United States
 Hugh Crawford (1813 ship)

See also
 Crawford (name)
 Crawford (disambiguation)